Phyllis Brooks (July 18, 1915 – August 1, 1995) was an American actress and model. She was born in Boise, Idaho. Some sources have also inaccurately cited 1914 as her year of birth, but 1915 is the correct year according to Social Security records.

Career

Modeling
She was a model for two years before progressing to a career in film. She stated, "I started posing for photographers as a lark, and it was a lot of fun."

She had been known as the "Ipana Toothpaste Girl", due to her work for that product.

Film
Initially known as Mary Brooks, she began her career in films in 1934 at age 20, in I've Been Around. Brooks, who had about 30 performances in films, was a B-movie leading lady during the 1930s and 1940s, with roles in such films as In Old Chicago (1937), Little Miss Broadway (1938) and The Shanghai Gesture (1941).

She appeared in Sidney Toler's Charlie Chan series, in the Shirley Temple films Rebecca of Sunnybrook Farm and in Little Miss Broadway.

Stage
On Broadway, Brooks appeared in Stage Door (1936–37), Panama Hattie (1940–42), The Night Before Christmas (1941), and Round Trip (1945).

Wartime activities

Brooks was reported (UK Sunday Telegraph December 1942) as being president of Parties Unlimited Inc. in an article about Hollywood at war. Along with actress Una Merkel and accompanied by film star Gary Cooper, Brooks was the first civilian woman to travel to the Pacific theater of war during World War II on a USO tour.

Personal life
Brooks was engaged at one time to Cary Grant. She married Torbert Macdonald on June 23, 1945, in Tarrytown, New York. Macdonald, who had been John F. Kennedy's roommate at Harvard University, went on to become an 11-term Massachusetts Congressman.

Brooks moved East to Cambridge, Massachusetts with her new husband in 1945 so that he could complete his studies at Harvard Law School. He had been a Harvard football captain and a decorated PT boat captain in World War II. He died in office in 1976.

Death
Brooks died on August 1, 1995, in Cape Neddick, Maine, aged 80.

Partial filmography

 One Exciting Adventure (1934) - Minor Role (uncredited)
 Strange Wives (1934) - The Actress
 The Man Who Reclaimed His Head (1934) - Secretary (uncredited)
 I've Been Around (1935) - Gay Blackstone
 McFadden's Flats (1935) - Mary Ellis Hall
 Lady Tubbs (1935) - Debutante (uncredited)
 Another Face (1935) - Sheila Barry
 To Beat the Band (1935) - Rowena
 Two in the Dark (1936) - Minor Role
 Follow the Fleet (1936) - Minor Role (uncredited)
 You Can't Have Everything (1937) - Evelyn Moore
 Dangerously Yours (1937) - Valerie Barton
 Ali Baba Goes to Town (1937) - Phyllis Brooks - at Premiere (uncredited)
 In Old Chicago (1938) - Ann Colby
 City Girl (1938) - Ellen Ward
 Walking Down Broadway (1938) - Vicki Stone
 Rebecca of Sunnybrook Farm (1938) - Lola Lee
 Little Miss Broadway (1938) - Barbara Shea
 Straight Place and Show (1938) - Barbara 'Babs' Drake
 Up the River (1938) - Helen Lindsay
 Charlie Chan in Honolulu (1938) - Judy Hayes
 Charlie Chan in Reno (1939) - Vivian Wells
 Lucky to Me (1939) - Pamela Stuart
 Slightly Honorable (1939) - Sarilla Cushing
 The Flying Squad (1940) - Ann Perryman
 The Shanghai Gesture (1941) - The Chorus Girl
 No Place for a Lady (1943) - Dolly Adair
 Silver Spurs (1943) - Mary Hardigan
 Hi'ya, Sailor (1943) - Nanette
 Lady in the Dark (1944) - Allison DuBois
 Wilson (1944) - Granddaughter (uncredited)
 Dangerous Passage (1944) - Nita Paxton
 High Powered (1945) - Marian Blair
 The Unseen (1945) - Maxine

References

External links

 
 
 
 
 Photos of Phyllis Brooks from The Shanghai Gesture

1915 births
1995 deaths
Actresses from Idaho
Female models from Idaho
American film actresses
American stage actresses
Spouses of Massachusetts politicians
People from Boise, Idaho
20th-century American actresses